Jane Draycott is a British poet. She is Senior Course Tutor on Oxford University's MSt in Creative Writing and teaches English and Creative Writing at the University of Lancaster.

Life and career
Draycott was born in London in 1954. She studied at King's College London and the University of Bristol. Her pamphlet No Theatre (Smith/Doorstop) was shortlisted for the Forward Prize for Best First Collection 1997, and her first full collection Prince Rupert's Drop  (1999), was shortlisted for the Forward Prize for Best Collection. In 2002, she was the winner of the Keats-Shelley Prize for Poetry and in 2004, she was nominated as one of the Poetry Book Society's 'Next Generation' poets. Her 2009 collection Over (Carcanet Press) was nominated for the T S Eliot Prize. Her other books include Christina the Astonishing (with Lesley Saunders and Peter Hay, 1998) and Tideway (illustrated by Peter Hay, 2002), both from Two Rivers Press. She was previously poet in residence at Henley's River and Rowing museum. She lectures in creative writing at Oxford University and the University of Lancaster, and has been a mentor on the Crossing Borders  creative writing initiative, which was set up by the British Council and Lancaster University. Her 2011 translation of the 14th century elegy Pearl - in which she aims at a fluid and echoing character which loosens some of the original end-stopped pulse - was a winner in the Stephen Spender Prize for translation. In 2013 she was Writer-in-Residence hosted by the Dutch Foundation for Literature in Amsterdam, researching Martinus Nijhoff's modernist narrative Awater. She was a Royal Literary Fund Lector 2014-16 and is an RLF Advisory Fellow 2018-21. Draycott has recorded a number of her poems for The Poetry Archive and is one of the poets featured in the national Poetry By Heart anthology. Her 2016 collection The Occupant  (Carcanet Press) was a Poetry Book Society Recommendation. An anthology of new translations of the 20th century artist and poet Henri Michaux Storms Under the Skin (a Poetry Book Society Recommended Translation) was published in 2017 by Two Rivers Press.

Awards
 1997 Forward Poetry Prize for Best First Collection - Shortlist (No Theatre)
 1998 BBC Radio 3 Poem For Radio - with Elizabeth James (Winner)
 1999 Forward Poetry Prize for Best Collection - Shortlist (Prince Rupert's Drop)
 2002 Forward Poetry Prize for Best Single Poem - Shortlist (Uses for the Thames)
 2002 Keats Shelley Prize (The Night Tree)
 2004 Next Generation poet (Poetry Book Society)
 2009 Hawthornden International Fellowship
 2009 T S Eliot Prize - Shortlist (Over)
 2011 Stephen Spender Prize for Pearl
 2012 National Poetry Competition - Second Prizewinner (Italy to Lord)
 2014 International Hippocrates Prize for Poetry and Medicine (The Return)
 2019 "TLS Mick Imlah Poetry Prize". - Second Prizewinner (In the bones of the disused gasometer)

Works
 
 
 Prince Rupert's Drop  (Carcanet Press, 1999)
 
 The Night Tree  (Carcanet Press, 2004)
 Over  (Carcanet Press, 2009)
 Pearl  (Carcanet Press, 2011)
 The Occupant (Carcanet Press, 2016)
 Storms Under the Skin (Two Rivers Press, 2017)

References

External links 
 Author's Website
 Salt profile and poems
 "Precisely perfect". Review of The Night Tree in The Guardian Saturday 25 September 2004
 
 Pearl (extract) in Modern Poetry in Translation
 'Italy to Lord' - Carol Rumens Poem of the Week in The Guardian 2 January 2017
 "The Occupant". in Modern Poetry in Translation journal 
 "India" - Poems on the Underground.

1954 births
Living people
Alumni of King's College London
English women poets